Patrik Berglund (born 2 June 1988) is a Swedish former professional ice hockey centre who played in the National Hockey League (NHL) with the St. Louis Blues and Buffalo Sabres. He was drafted 25th overall by the St. Louis Blues in the 2006 NHL Entry Draft. Internationally, Berglund represented Team Sweden on both the junior and senior levels, including playing on the team that won silver at the 2014 Winter Olympics.

Playing career
In the 2005–06 season, Berglund played for VIK Västerås HK in the HockeyAllsvenskan, the second highest league in Sweden. He was a top prospect in the 2006 NHL Entry Draft and was drafted 25th overall by the St. Louis Blues.

He scored his first NHL goal on 13 October 2008 against Vesa Toskala of the Toronto Maple Leafs. Paired on a line (called the "Kid Line" by Blues fans, due to the oldest player on the line being 22) with David Perron and his roommate. T. J. Oshie, Berglund became a scoring threat in St. Louis' surprise 2008–09 season, finishing the year with 21 goals and 26 assists for 47 points in 76 games.

During the 2012–13 NHL lockout, Berglund returned to Sweden to play for VIK Västerås HK.

On 25 June 2013 Berglund signed a one-year $3.25 million contract extension with the Blues. On 26 June 2014, Berglund signed an $11.1 million contract to continue playing with the Blues for 3 more years.

In the midst of the 2016–17 season, Berglund signed a five-year $19.25 million contract extension with the Blues on 24 February 2017.

During the off-season before the 2017–18 season, Berglund was injured while training and was expected to be out of the Blues lineup until December. He was activated off injured reserve on 29 November, and he made his season debut against the Anaheim Ducks that night.

On 1 July 2018, Berglund, along with Tage Thompson, Vladimír Sobotka, a first-round pick in the 2019 NHL Entry Draft and a second-round pick in the 2021 NHL Entry Draft, were traded by the Blues to the Buffalo Sabres in exchange for Ryan O'Reilly. Berglund could have blocked the trade, but his agent failed to submit paperwork by the deadline.

On 15 December, Berglund was suspended indefinitely by the Sabres for failure to report to the team. At the time of the suspension Berglund had missed the previous two games with what was said to be an illness, but the Sabres' head coach Phil Housley commented that "obviously it developed into something different." On 19 December, the Sabres terminated Berglund's contract. Berglund later said in an interview that he was no longer happy playing professional hockey and was taking a hiatus from the game to improve his mental health. At the time of his suspension and subsequent release, Berglund was on track to set career-low offensive statistics with just 2 goals and 4 points in 23 games, and had been made a healthy scratch several times.

On 1 July 2019, Berglund returned to resume his professional career in Sweden, agreeing to a one-year contract with Djurgårdens IF of the SHL. In making his long-awaited SHL debut in the 2019–20 season, Berglund regained his offensive touch, registering 17 goals and 31 points in 49 regular season games before the playoffs were cancelled due to the COVID-19 pandemic. 

As a free agent and speculation of a return to the NHL, Berglund opted to remain in Sweden, agreeing to a two-year contract with Brynäs IF on 15 July 2020.

Career statistics

Regular season and playoffs

International

Awards and honors

References

External links
 

1988 births
Living people
Buffalo Sabres players
Djurgårdens IF Hockey players
Ice hockey players at the 2014 Winter Olympics
Medalists at the 2014 Winter Olympics
National Hockey League first-round draft picks
Olympic ice hockey players of Sweden
Olympic medalists in ice hockey
Olympic silver medalists for Sweden
Sportspeople from Västerås
St. Louis Blues draft picks
St. Louis Blues players
Swedish ice hockey centres
VIK Västerås HK players